Hugh McIntosh may refer to:

Hugh McIntosh (civil engineer) (1768–1840), Scottish civil engineering contractor
Hugh McIntosh (provost) (died 2002), provost of St Mary's Cathedral, Glasgow
Hugh D. McIntosh (1876–1942), Australian show-business entrepreneur

See also
Hugh Mackintosh (1870–1936), Scottish theologian